The  International University of America  was the precursor of Britain's International University of America in London.  The European University of America began in 1980 as a small private business college in San Francisco, California.  The London Campus opened in February 1992.

For more than a decade the San Francisco branch of the school, which focused largely on French students seeking an American MBA program, offered a California state-approved master's degree in international business, focusing on a single major project.  Over time the university shifted its focus to London, eventually closing its San Francisco operation.  It is now known as the International University of America in London.

References 

Defunct universities and colleges in England
Educational institutions established in 1980